Kasni is a large village located in Jhajjar district in the Indian state of Haryana.

Demographics
In 2011, The Kasni village has population of 4034 of which 2177 are males while 1857 are females.

Notable people
 Kanishtha Dhankar

Religion
Majority of the residents are Hindu.

See also 
 Sarola
 Girdharpur, Jhajjar
 Khudan
 Chhapar, Jhajjar
 Dhakla, Jhajjar

References 

Villages in Jhajjar district